Imperial Mills is an unincorporated community in northern Alberta, Canada within Lac La Biche County.

Localities in Lac La Biche County